The 1988 Asian Junior Women's Volleyball Championship was held in Jakarta, Indonesia from 14 August to 22 August 1988

Preliminary round

Pool A

|}

|}

Pool B

|}

|}

Classification 9th–10th

|}

Final round

Classification 5th–8th

Championship

5th–8th semifinals

|}

Semifinals

|}

7th place

|}

5th place

|}

3rd place

|}

Final

|}

Final standing

References
Results (Archived 2014-10-17)

A
V
V
Asian women's volleyball championships
Asian Junior